Anti-Social is a 2015 Hungarian-British crime film written and directed by Reg Traviss and starring Gregg Sulkin, Meghan Markle, and Josh Myers.

Premise
In London, a successful street artist is forced to jeopardise his future to help his criminal brother when gang rivalry escalates.

Cast
Gregg Sulkin as Dee
Meghan Markle as Kirsten
Josh Myers as Marcus
Christian Berkel as Philip
Michael Maris as Kwame
Andrew Shim as Jason
James Devlin as Nicky
Richie Campbell as Dominic
Sophie Colquhoun as Emma
Caroline Ford as Rochelle
Skepta as Leon
Aymen Hamdouchi as Junior
Doug Allen as Chris
María Fernández Ache as Nadine
Giacomo Mancini as Shaun
Sasha Frost as Tara
Zita Téby as Kerry
Lisa Moorish as Leila
Ben Peel as Baxter
Amanda Ryan as Claire
Rob Knighton as Tim
Tebraiz Shahzad as Karim
Hajni Zsigar as Ursula
Reiss Davison as Danny
Philipp Heerwagen as Airline Steward
Jeremy Wheeler as Customs Officer
Boglárka Komán as Punk Girl
Bernadett von Grega as Elegant Gallery Owner
Violetta Kassapi as Rude Girl
Egerszegi Anna as Jeweler's Assistant
James Fred Harkins Jr. as Jeweler
Ehijele Mohammed as Shaun's Friend
Torren Simonsz as Male Model 1
Grant Sulkin as Male Model 2
Marianne Malleck as Fashion PR Girl
Cory Rhys White as Vile Street Youth
Scott Alexander Young as TV Reporter
Hans Peterson as Flying Squad Officer
Helen Austin as News Reporter

Reception
The film has a 25% rating on Rotten Tomatoes.  Cath Clarke of Time Out, Alan Jones of Radio Times and Mark Kermode and Leslie Felperin of The Guardian all gave the film two stars out of five.  Simon Crook of Empire gave the film one star out of five.

References

External links
 
 

2015 films
English-language Hungarian films
British crime films
Hungarian crime films
Films set in London
2015 crime films
Films scored by George Kallis
2010s English-language films
Films directed by Reg Traviss
2010s British films